The American Surgical Association is the oldest surgical organization in the United States.

History
It was founded in 1880. Their publication, Annals of Surgery, was started in 1885.

A collection of the association's papers are held at the National Library of Medicine.

Heads 

Samuel D. Gross (1880)
Edward Mott Moore (1883)
William Thompson Briggs (1884)
Moses Gunn (1885)
Hunter McGuire (1886)
David Hayes Agnew (1887)
David Williams Cheever (1888)
David W. Yandell (1889)
Claudius Henry Mastin (1890)
Phineas Sanborn Conner (1891)
Nicholas Senn (1892)
James Ewing Mears (1893)
Frederic Shepard Dennis (1894)
Louis McLane Tiffany (1895)
John Collins Warren (1896)
Theodore F. Prewitt (1897)
William W. Keen (1898)
Robert F. Weir (1899)
Roswell Park (1900)
Deforest Willard (1901)
Maurice H. Richardson (1902)
Nathaniel P. Dandridge (1903)
George Ben Johnston (1904)
Albert Vander Veer (1905)
Dudley Peter Allen (1906)
William H. Carmalt (1907)
C. B. De Nancre´ De (1908)
Rudolph Matas (1909)
Richard H. Harte (1910)
Arpad G. Gerster (1911)
Charles A. Powers (1912)
William James Mayo (1913)
George E. Armstrong (1914)
Robert G. Leconte (1915)
Samuel J. Mixter (1916)
Thomas W. Huntington (1917)
Lewis S. Pilcher (1918)
George Emerson Brewer (1919)
John B. Roberts (1920)
John Miller Turpin Finney (1921)
L. L. McArthur (1922)
George Washington Crile (1923)
Albert J. Ochsner (1924)
John H. Gibbon Sr. (1925)
Harvey Cushing (1926)
Emmet Rixford (1927)
Ellsworth Eliot Jr. (1928)
Fred B. Lund (1929)
Alexander Primrose (1930)
Charles Horace Mayo (1931)
Arthur Dean Bevan (1932)
Daniel Fiske Jones (1933)
Edward William Archibald (1934)
Eugene H. Pool (1935)
Evarts Ambrose Graham (1936)
Arthur W. Elting (1937)
Dallas B. Phemister (1938)
Allen Whipple (1939)
David Cheever (1940)
Harvey B. Stone (1941)
Vernon C. David (1942)
Frederick A. Coller (1943)
William Darrach (1944–45)
Edward Delos Churchill (1946)
Elliott Cutler (1947)
William Gallie (1947)
Fred Wharton Rankin (1948)
Thomas G. Orr (1949)
Samuel Clark Harvey (1950)
Daniel C. Elkin (1951)
Robert S. Dinsmore (1952)
Howard Christian Naffziger (1953)
John Heysham Gibbon (1954)
Alfred Blalock (1955)
Loyal Davis (1956)
John H. Mulholland (1957)
I. S. Ravdin (1958)
Warren Henry Cole (1959)
John D. Stewart (1960)
J. Englebert Dunphy (1961)
Oliver Cope (1962)
Warfield M. Firor (1963)
Robert M. Zollinger (1964)
Leland S. McKittrick (1965)
Oscar Creech Jr. (1966)
William P. Longmire Jr. (1967)
Owen Harding Wangensteen (1968)
William A. Altemeier (1969)
William D. Holden (1970)
Francis Daniels Moore (1971)
Jonathan E. Rhoads (1972)
H. William Scott Jr. (1973)
William H. Muller Jr. (1974)
James Hardy (1975)
Claude E. Welch (1976)
David Sabiston (1977)
Oliver H. Beahrs (1978)
Tom Shires (1979)
James V. Maloney Jr. (1980)
C. Rollins Hanlon (1981)
W. Dean Warren (1982)
Mark M. Ravitch (1983)
Eugene M. Bricker (1984)
W. Gerald Austen (1985)
Charles George Drake (1986)
Henry T. Bahnson (1987)
John Najarian (1988)
John A. Mannick (1989)
Robert Zeppa (1990)
James C. Thompson (1991)
Lloyd D. MacLean (1992)
Seymour I. Schwartz (1993)
George F. Sheldon (1994)
Samuel A. Wells Jr. (1995)
Clyde F. Barker (1996)
Frank C. Spencer (1997)
Lazar J. Greenfield (1998)
Basil A. Pruitt Jr. (1999)
John L. Cameron (2000)
Haile Debas (2001)
Murray Brennan (2002)
R. Scott Jones (2003)
Hiram Polk (2004)
Carlos Alberto Pellegrini (2005)
Jay L. Grosfeld (2006)
Courtney M. Townsend Jr. (2007)
Anthony D. Whittemore (2008)
Donald Trunkey (2009)
Kirby I. Bland (2010)
Timothy J. Eberlein (2011)
L.D. Britt (2012)
Layton F. Rikkers (2013)
Anna M. Ledgerwood (2014)
James S. Economou (2015)
Keith D. Lillemoe (2016)
Ronald V. Maier (2017)
E. Christopher Ellison (2018)
Robin S. McLeod (2019, 2020)
Selwyn M. Vickers (2021)
Diana L. Farmer (2022)

Awards
American Surgical Association Foundation Fellowship Research Award 
ASA Medallion for Scientific Achievement 
ASA Flance-Karl Award

References

External links
 American Surgical Association Archives (1878-2009)—National Library of Medicine finding aid

 
Organizations established in 1880